Spear of Destiny is a British rock band, formed in London in 1982 by lead vocalist, guitarist and principal songwriter Kirk Brandon and bassist Stan Stammers. It has had an ever-changing line-up through the years.

They have had 10 UK Singles Chart entries. Four reached the Top 50 but only one made the Top 20 – "Never Take Me Alive" (1987).

History
Formed in 1982, the band's original line-up consisted of Kirk Brandon, Stan Stammers, Chris Bell and Lascelles James. In late 1983, this line-up was superseded by Dolphin Taylor on drums, Alan St. Clair on guitar, John Lennard on saxophone and Neil Pyzer on keyboards and additional saxophone. In 1984, John Lennard was replaced by Mickey Donnelly on saxophone.

Spear of Destiny recorded one session for John Peel (recorded 22 November 1982, transmitted on BBC Radio 1 on 29 November 1982).

"The band played a punk-influenced form of power rock, which often had an anthemic feel."

Their second studio album, One Eyed Jacks was released in 1984. It reached No. 22 in the UK Albums Chart Spear of Destiny’s reputation in the mid-1980s depended to a greater extent on their live performances.

In 1985, their third studio album, World Service reached the UK Top 20. 

On 22 June 1985 they were one of five bands supporting U2 at the Longest Day concert at the Milton Keynes Bowl. The other acts were the Faith Brothers, Billy Bragg, the Ramones and R.E.M.

Founding member Stan Stammers left the band in 1986. In the wake of the release of the fourth studio album, Outland (1987) and its Top 15 hit "Never Take Me Alive", the band began achieving some chart success and staging sell-out concerts, including a support slot to U2 at Wembley Stadium. However, ill fortune struck on the eve of the band's appearance at the Reading Festival, as Brandon developed reactive arthritis which obliged the band to put all their plans on hold for nearly a year.

In addition to Brandon and Stammers, past members of the band in the 1980s included former Gillan drummer Pete Barnacle, former JoBoxers bassist Chris Bostock, former Adam and the Ants guitarist Marco Pirroni, and former Tom Robinson Band and Stiff Little Fingers drummer Dolphin Taylor.

Brandon was also a member of the supergroup Dead Men Walking.

Discography

Grapes of Wrath (1983) – UK No. 62
One Eyed Jacks (1984) – UK No. 22
World Service (1985) – UK No. 11
Outland (1987) – UK No. 16
The Price You Pay (1988) – UK No. 37
Sod's Law (1991)
Religion (1997)
Volunteers (2000)
Morning Star (2003)
Loadestone (2005)
Imperial Prototype (2007)
Omega Point (2010)
31 (2014)
Tontine (2018)
Ghost Population (2022)

See also
 List of post-punk bands
 Theatre of Hate
 Kirk Brandon's 10:51

References

External links
 
 
 
 Kirkbrandon.com (official website)
 Stanstammers.com (official website)
 The Engine Room (the Spear of Destiny rhythm section)

English rock music groups
English new wave musical groups
English alternative rock groups
Musical groups established in 1983
Virgin Records artists
English post-punk music groups
Musical groups from London